Alla Vladimirovna Kuleshova (born 28 March 1945) is a retired Russian rower who won three European titles in 1966–1972.

References

External links
 

1945 births
Living people
Russian female rowers
Soviet female rowers
European Rowing Championships medalists